The Mount Washington Auto Road—originally the Mount Washington Carriage Road—is a  toll road in southern Coos County, New Hampshire that extends from New Hampshire Route 16 in Green's Grant, just north of Pinkham Notch, westward across Pinkham's Grant and Thompson and Meserve's Purchase to the summit of Mount Washington in the White Mountains of the US state of New Hampshire. The road was completed and opened to the public in 1861.

Operations

The Auto Road may be traversed by private vehicles, and there are also guided tours in vans, called stages.  The toll on private cars includes a bumper sticker with the text, "THIS CAR CLIMBED MT. WASHINGTON". No bicycles are allowed on the road, except for participants during specific bicycle events (see below).

Weather sensors
The road has a series of sensors located at various altitudes along it. The sensors transmit weather data via a solar-powered radio link.

Events
The oldest auto race in the United States, the Mount Washington Hillclimb Auto Race, was hosted on the auto road in 1904.

Every year in June, the mountain road is host to the Mount Washington Road Race, an event which attracts hundreds of runners.

In July, the mountain road hosts Newton's Revenge, and in August the Mount Washington Auto Road Bicycle Hillclimb, both of which are bicycle races that run the same route as the road race. The hillclimb's most notable victor to date has been former Tour de France contender Tyler Hamilton. The climb is regarded as one of the world's toughest for cyclists—it features a greater altitude gain, and is steeper, than the Mortirolo Pass, the Monte Zoncolan, and the Alto de El Angliru, and is far steeper than any of the famous climbs featured in the Tour de France.

Another event, although not a race, is the annual MINIs On Top event. Now in its twelfth year, the drive to the summit began with 73 BMW MINI Cooper and Cooper S vehicles and now exceeds 200 cars. The only reason more MINIs do not drive to the summit is the fact there is not enough space to hold all the cars, despite their diminutive size. MINIs On Top (or MOT) is held the Saturday of Father's Day weekend every June.

Gallery

See also

References

External links

 Mount Washington Auto Road official website

1861 establishments in New Hampshire
Auto Road
Non-freeway toll roads
Toll roads in New Hampshire
Tourist attractions in Coös County, New Hampshire
Transportation in Coös County, New Hampshire